Uutiset is a news programme from Sveriges Television. It is broadcast on SVT2 during 17:45 to 17:55 in Finnish. However, just like most foreign-language programmes aired on Swedish television, the show is subtitled in Swedish, but when an interviewee responds in Swedish the response is subtitled into Finnish. The program started broadcasting on 22 August 1988. Before the "Nyhetsflytt" (News swap) on 15 January 2001, Uutiset was broadcast on Kanal 1 and SVT1 at 17:50.

It was launched on 22 August 1988 together with SVT's channel in Finland, SVT4 (later renamed as SVT Europa).

See also
 Sweden Finns

References

External links
 Uutiset main page  (in Finnish) 

Sveriges Television original programming
Swedish television news shows
Finnish-language mass media
1988 Swedish television series debuts
1980s Swedish television series
1990s Swedish television series
2000s Swedish television series
2010s Swedish television series
2020s Swedish television series